Martín Pitayo Martínez (born January 10, 1960) is a retired long-distance runner from Mexico, who won the gold medal at the 1991 Pan American Games in Havana, Cuba. He also won the 1990 edition of the Chicago Marathon, clocking 2:09:41.

Achievements

References
 Year Rankings
 

1960 births
Living people
Mexican male long-distance runners
Mexican male marathon runners
Athletes (track and field) at the 1984 Summer Olympics
Athletes (track and field) at the 1991 Pan American Games
Athletes (track and field) at the 1996 Summer Olympics
Olympic athletes of Mexico
Place of birth missing (living people)
Chicago Marathon male winners
Pan American Games medalists in athletics (track and field)
Pan American Games gold medalists for Mexico
Medalists at the 1991 Pan American Games
20th-century Mexican people